Grad is a village in the Municipality of Cerklje na Gorenjskem in the Upper Carniola region of Slovenia.

Church

The local church is dedicated to Saint Helena and the current building is from the late 17th century with later alterations, but is likely built over earlier foundations with a reused stone in the belfry inscribed with the date 1426.

References

External links

Grad on Geopedia

Populated places in the Municipality of Cerklje na Gorenjskem